The Beekman School (originally The Tutoring School of New York) is a private high school in New York City. It was founded in 1925 by George Matthew.  It primarily serves grades 9-12 .

History
Founded in 1925, and incorporated in 1927, The Tutoring School of New York offers high school diploma requirements to students one-on-one.  Located in a Manhattan townhouse, teachers are hired based on specific student needs.

In 1990, the school changed its name to The Beekman School, with The Tutoring School becoming a program within The Beekman School.  The Beekman program features classes with an average 7:1 student-to-teacher ratio, a rolling admissions policy, as well as flexible scheduling and course options.

The Tutoring School
The Tutoring School offers one-on-one classes or classes of no more than 3 students; classes that are personalized in terms of pacing, scheduling, or curriculum; and tutoring for specific needs. Tutoring School sessions occur at the school, off-site, or online with video-conferencing software.  The Tutoring School has also worked with many other schools throughout the country to complete specific curricula for students who are not able to complete coursework at their home school.

Academics
The Beekman School is a college preparatory program.  Course curricula is designed to meet or exceed the requirements set by the New York State Board of Regents and prepare students for colleges and universities worldwide.  All students must write a research paper during the fourth quarter in their English class.

International Students
The Beekman School accepts international students and for the 2012 school year had four Chinese students who roomed with local families.

The Beekman School Merit Award
Created in 2013, The Beekman School Merit Award is an award of 50% tuition remission for new 9th or 10th graders who remain at the school in good standing.

Notable alumni
Zachary Cole Smith, singer and frontman of DIIV (did not graduate)

See also
 Education in New York City

References

External links
The Beekman School website
Private School Review
Petersons

List of high schools in New York City#Manhattan

Private high schools in Manhattan
Educational institutions established in 1925
1925 establishments in New York City